WJKI-FM (103.5 FM) is a radio station licensed to serve Bethany Beach, Delaware. The station is owned by The Voice Radio Network. It airs a classic rock format. The station has been assigned these call letters by the Federal Communications Commission since November 21, 2018.

With the sale of WXSH pending, the Classic rock format is now being simulcasted on WJKI (formerly WICO) and on 102.9 FM (W275CX).

References

External links

JKI-FM
Classic rock radio stations in the United States
Radio stations established in 1996
1996 establishments in Delaware